Helmut Eberspächer (18 November 1915 – 19 June 2011) was a German businessman and chairman of Eberspächer. During World War II, he served in the Wehrmacht as a fighter pilot. A flying ace, he was awarded the Knight's Cross of the Iron Cross, the highest award in the military and paramilitary forces of Nazi Germany during World War II. He was credited with 7 victories, each resulting in the destruction of an enemy aircraft.

In 1950, he and his cousin Walter took over the family business, Eberspächer GmbH. He ran the business as chairman until 1988, and remained as an honorary chairman until 2005. He also served on the board of the Confederation of German Employers' Associations (BDA) and the German Automotive Industry Association. Under his leadership, Eberspächer became one of the leading automobile industry suppliers in Germany, with approximately 5,600 employees worldwide and 1.9 billion Euros in sales in 2010.

Military career
 	
Eberspächer was born on 18 November 1915 in Tübingen, at that time part of the Kingdom of Württemberg, a federated state of the German Empire. In 1934 he volunteered for military service in the Reichswehr, and served in an armoured reconnaissance battalion. In parallel to his military service he studied mechanical engineering at the University of Stuttgart. Following his graduation in 1939, he transferred to the Luftwaffe. From July 1940 to January 1943 he served with the 7.(Fernaufklärungs-) Staffel of Lehrgeschwader 2 (7th Long Range Reconnaissance Squadron of the 2nd Demonstration Wing) on both Western and Eastern Fronts. He then converted to a ground attack role, and from March 1943 served with Schnellkampfgeschwader 10 (SKG 10—10th Fast Bomber Wing), flying fighter-bomber missions over southern England and anti-shipping operations in the English Channel. He was promoted to the rank of Hauptmann (captain) on 1 May 1944 and appointed as Staffelkapitän (leader of the squadron) in Kurt Dahlmann's I./SKG 10 (1st Group).

Early on D-Day 6 June 1944, Eberspächer led four Focke-Wulf Fw 190s of 3./SKG 10 (3rd Squadron of SKG 10) over Normandy. At 05:01 they had intercepted a formation of Royal Air Force Avro Lancasters. Three were claimed as downed by Eberspächer, one of them being Lancaster ND739 of No. 97 Squadron RAF, flown by the squadron's commanding officer, W/C Jimmie Carter. His seven-man crew had earned four Distinguished Flying Crosses and three Distinguished Flying Medals. The wreckage of ND739 was located and excavated in 2012. An assortment of items were recovered including the wedding ring belonging to crew member Albert Chambers.

Eberspächer was awarded the German Cross in Gold on 23 July 1944 and the Knight's Cross of the Iron Cross on 24 January 1945, after 170 Jabo (German abbreviation for Jagdbomber—fighter-bomber) missions over the Western Front. He flew sorties during the Battle of the Bulge and against the Remagen bridge and the established US Army bridgehead. His unit, I./SKG 10 (1st Group of SKG 10), was assigned to Kampfgeschwader 51 as III. Gruppe (3rd Group) on 30 June 1944. His squadron was then redesignated as the 3. Staffel/Nachtschlachtgruppe 20 night harassment attack squadron in October 1944. He survived the war and was credited with a total of seven aerial victories, including three at night.

Later life and business career

After the war, Eberspächer joined the family business, which had been founded by his grandfather, Jakob Eberspächer, in 1965 as a plumber's workshop which was known as "Glasdachfabrik-Eberspächer" (Eberspächer Roof-Glazing). He succeeded Hanns-Martin Schleyer in 1978 as president of the Landesvereinigung Baden-Württembergischer Arbeitgeberverbände (State Federation of Baden-Württemberg Employers' Associations) after Schleyer was kidnapped and murdered by the Red Army Faction on 18 October 1977. Eberspächer also supported the Internationale Bachakademie Stuttgart.

In July 1989, in the aftermath of the Flick affair, Eberspächer was fined 140,000 DM for tax evasion. He had transferred and donated more than 300,000 DM into the accounts of the political parties Christian Democratic Union and Free Democratic Party via the "Gesellschaft zur Förderung der Wirtschaft Baden-Württemberg" (the Society for the Advancement of Economics in Baden-Württemberg) between 1972 and 1981.

He died on 19 June 2011 in Esslingen am Neckar. The Eberspächer family are heirs of his business and are ranked 264th of the 500 richest Germans in 2013, with net assets of 450 Million Euros, an increase of 100 Million Euros over the year 2012.

Summary of career
Mathews and Foreman, authors of Luftwaffe Aces — Biographies and Victory Claims, researched the German Federal Archives and state that Ebersbächer claimed seven aerial victories, including three at night.

Awards
 Iron Cross (1939)
 2nd Class (5 May 1941)
 1st Class (5 August 1941)
 Honour Goblet of the Luftwaffe on 17 April 1944 as Oberleutnant and pilot
 German Cross in Gold on 1 January 1945 as Hauptmann in the I./Schnellkampfgeschwader 10
 Knight's Cross of the Iron Cross on 26 January 1945 as Hauptmann and Staffelkapitän of the 3./Nachtschlacht-Gruppe 20
 Order of Merit of Baden-Württemberg (1979) presented on 21 April 1979 at Ludwigsburg Palace

Notes

References

Citations

Bibliography

External links

1915 births
2011 deaths
People from Tübingen
Luftwaffe pilots
German World War II flying aces
Recipients of the Gold German Cross
Recipients of the Knight's Cross of the Iron Cross
University of Stuttgart alumni
Businesspeople from Baden-Württemberg
German people convicted of tax crimes
Recipients of the Order of Merit of Baden-Württemberg
People from the Kingdom of Württemberg
Military personnel from Baden-Württemberg